The Wattignies was a 74-gun ship of the line of the French Navy.

She took part in the Expédition d'Irlande in 1798 under captain Antoine René Thévenard.

In July 1808, she was converted to a fluyt.

Ships of the line of the French Navy
Téméraire-class ships of the line
1794 ships